Randy Bernard (born January 31, 1967) is the former CEO of Professional Bull Riders and IndyCar. He is currently co-managing Garth Brooks.

Career

Professional Bull Riders
Bernard previously served as the CEO of Professional Bull Riders, serving from 1995 to 2010. 
Bernard sold PBR in 2007 and stayed an additional 3 years, then opted out of his fourth year of his contract to become CEO of INDYCAR.

IndyCar

Bernard assumed the role as IndyCar's CEO in March 2010, replacing series founder Tony George. At the onset, he was vocal about increasing the sport's visibility among general audiences, expanding the schedule to markets that are important to advertisers, and achieving a 50/50 split of oval and road course races. He planned a return for IndyCar to Las Vegas Motor Speedway for the 2011 season, only to have the race end in tragedy. He was able to secure a return to Fontana in 2012 and Pocono for 2013. Under Bernard's tenure, the series also retired the name "Indy Racing League" and starting in 2011, it was re-branded under the name "IndyCar". He also oversaw the ICONIC Project, which selected a new engine and chassis package for the 2012 season. It led to the return of Chevrolet and manufacturer competition to IndyCar. On October 28, 2012, the Indianapolis Motor Speedway board of directors announced that Bernard will be leaving as CEO of IndyCar.

National FFA Foundation
Bernard sat on the Sponsors Board for the National FFA Foundation in 2014.

Honors
Bernard was inducted into the PBR’s Ring of Honor in 2010 and the National Cowboy & Western Heritage Museum's Rodeo Hall of Fame in 2014.

Personal 
Randy has two children: Priscilla, and Alexandria.

References

Category:Rodeo personnel

IndyCar Series people
Auto racing executives
Living people
1967 births
Professional Bull Riders: Heroes and Legends
Rodeo promoters and managers